The 1984 European Cup Winners' Cup Final was a football match contested between Juventus of Italy and Porto of Portugal. It was the final match of the 1983–84 European Cup Winners' Cup and the 24th European Cup Winners' Cup final. It was held at St. Jakob Stadium in Basel, Switzerland.

Juventus won the match 2–1 due to goals by Beniamino Vignola and Zbigniew Boniek. It was the fourth year in succession the final had been settled by a 2–1 scoreline.

Route to the final

Match

Details

See also
1983–84 European Cup Winners' Cup
1984 European Cup Final
1984 UEFA Cup Final
Blocco-Juve
FC Porto in international football
Juventus F.C. in international football

References

External links
UEFA Cup Winners' Cup results at Rec.Sport.Soccer Statistics Foundation

3
Cup Winners' Cup Final 1984
Cup Winners' Cup Final 1984
1984
UEFA Cup Winners' Cup Finals
Euro
Euro
May 1984 sports events in Europe
Sports competitions in Basel
20th century in Basel